Khikmatillokh Turaev (born 25 May 1995) is an Uzbekistani judoka. He won the gold medal in the men's 73 kg event at the 2019 Military World Games held in Wuhan, China.

At the 2019 Asian-Pacific Judo Championships held in Fujairah, United Arab Emirates, he won one of the bronze medals in the men's 73 kg event. At the 2019 Summer Universiade held in Naples, Italy, he also won one of the bronze medals in the men's 73 kg event. In the same year, he also competed in the men's 73 kg event at the World Judo Championships held in Tokyo, Japan where he was eliminated in his first match by Mohamed Mohyeldin of Egypt.

In January 2021, he won one of the bronze medals in his event at the Judo World Masters held in Doha, Qatar. In June 2021, he lost his bronze medal match in the men's 73 kg event at the World Judo Championships held in Budapest, Hungary.

He competed in the men's 73 kg event at the 2020 Summer Olympics in Tokyo, Japan. He was eliminated in his second match by An Chang-rim of South Korea. At the 2021 Judo Grand Slam Abu Dhabi held in Abu Dhabi, United Arab Emirates, he won the silver medal in his event.

References

External links
 

Living people
1995 births
Place of birth missing (living people)
Uzbekistani male judoka
Universiade medalists in judo
Universiade bronze medalists for Uzbekistan
Medalists at the 2019 Summer Universiade
Judoka at the 2020 Summer Olympics
Olympic judoka of Uzbekistan
21st-century Uzbekistani people